Navibank Sài Gòn Football Club was a Vietnam professional football club based in Ho Chi Minh City, active from 2009 to 2012.

Their home stadium was Thống Nhất Stadium.

Honours

National competitions
League
V.League 2:
 Winners (1): 2008 (as Quân khu 4)
Cup
 Vietnamese National Cup:
 Winners (1): 2011

Season-by-season domestic record

Performance in AFC competitions
AFC Cup: 1 appearance
2012: Group stage

References

Association football clubs established in 2009
Football clubs in Vietnam
Football clubs in Ho Chi Minh City
Association football clubs disestablished in 2012